Stigma is the first full-length album by the South African metal band Mind Assault. Stigma was released in February 2008. The album has received largely positive reviews.

Track listing

My Donker
Prison Of Flesh
Innocent Blood
Paint My Mind Black
Hoekom
Suffer
Tranquil Thoughts
Rise Once Again
Veroordeel
Stadig Verblind
We Will Prevail
This Is The End
Revenge

Reviews
Lords Of Metal

Band members

Jacques Fourie - Vocals
Francois Pretorius - Guitar
Patrick Davidson - Guitar
Donovan Tose - Bass
Andries Smit - Drums

Credits
Mix and Master: Jarod Gunston
Engineer: Theunis Cilliers
Artwork: Brendon Thomas

References

External links
 Band website

2008 albums
Mind Assault albums